Splat Magazine Renegade Paintball is a paintball first-person shooter developed by Cat Daddy Games and published by Global Star Software.

Publication history
It was released for Microsoft Windows and the Xbox video game console on October 11, 2005. Upon release, the game had numerous bugs, but Splat Magazine countered this by releasing an update that fixes most of the bugs.

Reception

Splat Magazine Renegade Paintball received negative reviews from critics upon release. On Metacritic, the game holds scores of 45/100 for the PC version (based on 10 reviews) and 44/100 for the Xbox version (based on 14 reviews). On GameRankings, the game holds scores of 49.22% for the PC version (based on 9 reviews) and 49.54% for the Xbox version (based on 13 reviews).

References

2005 video games
Cat Daddy Games games
First-person shooters
Global Star Software games
Paintball video games
Take-Two Interactive games
Video games developed in the United States
Windows games
Xbox games